Polylopha epidesma is a species of moth of the family Tortricidae first described by Oswald Bertram Lower in 1901. It is found in India, Sri Lanka and Australia.

The wingspan is about 16 mm. The forewings are ashy-grey whitish, mixed with greenish leaden, and strewn with numerous tufts of ashy-grey scales, which become blackish posteriorly. The hindwings are dark fuscous, but lighter on the basal half. Its larval food plant is Polyalthia longifolia.

References

Moths described in 1901
Polyorthini